Dmitriyevka is a rural locality (a khutor) in Gremyachenskoye Rural Settlement, Khokholsky District, Voronezh Oblast, Russia. The population was 129 as of 2010. There are 6 streets.

Geography 
Dmitriyevka is located on the Yemancha River, 22 km southeast of Khokholsky (the district's administrative centre) by road. Gremyachye is the nearest rural locality.

References 

Rural localities in Khokholsky District